The 2004 National Hurling League, known for sponsorship reasons as the Allianz National Hurling League, was the 73rd edition of the National Hurling League (NHL), an annual hurling competition for the GAA county teams. Galway won the league, beating Waterford in the final.

Structure

Division 1
There are 12 teams in Division 1, divided into 1A and 1B. Each team plays all the others in its group once, earning 2 points for a win and 1 for a draw.
The top three in 1A and 1B advance to the Division 1 Final Group.
The bottom three in 1A and 1B go into the Division 1 Relegation Group.

Each team in the Final Group plays the other three teams that it did not play in the first five games. The top two teams go into the NHL final – only points earned in these last three games count.
Each team in the Relegation Group plays the other three teams that it did not play in the first five games. The bottom team is relegated – only points earned in these last three games count.

Division 2
There are 10 teams in Division 2, divided into 2A and 2B. Each team plays all the others in its group once, earning 2 points for a win and 1 for a draw.
The top three in 2A and 2B advance to the Division 2 Promotion Group.
The bottom two in 2A and 2B go into the Division 2 Relegation Group.

Each team in the Promotion Group plays the other three teams that it did not play in the first four games. The top two teams go into the Division 2 final – only points earned in these last three games count. Final winners are promoted.
Each team in the Relegation Group plays the other two teams that it did not play in the first four games. The bottom team is relegated – only points earned in these last two games count.

Division 3
There are 10 teams in Division 3, divided into 3A and 3B. Each team plays all the others in its group once, earning 2 points for a win and 1 for a draw.
The top three in 3A and 3B advance to the Division 3 Promotion Group.
The bottom two in 3A and 3B go into the Division 3 Shield Group.

Each team in the Promotion Group plays the other three teams that it did not play in the first four games. The top two teams go into the Division 3 final – only points earned in these last three games count. Final winners are promoted.
Each team in the Shield Group plays the other two teams that it did not play in the first four games. The top two play the Division 3 Shield Final.

Overview

Division 1
Galway won their first league title in four seasons, as 'the Westerners' recorded two defeats throughout the entire league.  Waterford, who were league runners-up, suffered three defeats in the group stages before falling to Galway in the final.

Down at the other end of the table, Dublin and Antrim went through the initial group stages without a single victory.  However, a relegation group of six teams resulted in Offaly ending up at the bottom and facing relegation for the following season.

Division 1

Kilkenny came into the season as defending champions of the 2003 season. Antrim entered Division 1 as the promoted team.

On 9 May 2004, Galway won the title following a 2-15 to 1-13 win over Waterford in the final. It was their first league title since 2000 and their 8th National League title overall.

Offaly, who were unlucky not to make the final group, were relegated from Division 1 after losing all of their group stage matches in the relegation group.

Galway's Eugene Cloonan was the Division 1 top scorer with 10-62.

Division 1A table

Group stage results

Division 1B table

Group stage results

Group 1 table

Group 1 results

Group 2 table

Group 2 results

Knock-out stage

Final

Scoring statistics

Top scorers overall

Top scorers in a single game

Division 2

Derry and Mayo entered Division 2 as the respective relegated and promoted teams from the 2003 season.

On 9 May 2004, Down won the title following a 5-15 to 3-7 win over Westmeath in the final.

Mayo were relegated from Division 2 after losing all of their group stage matches in the relegation group.

Westmeath's Andrew Mitchell was the Division 2 top scorer with 1-56.

Division 2A table

Group stage results

Division 2B table

Group stage results

Group 1 table

Group 1 results

Group 2 table

Group 2 results

Knock-out stage

Final

Scoring statistics

Top scorers overall

Top scorers in a single game

Division 3

Division 3A table

Group stage results

Division 3B table

Group 1 table

Group 2 table

Knock-out stage

Shield final

Final

References

External links
 National Hurling League Division 1 results from 2004

League
National Hurling League seasons